Notable people who are from or have lived in Manhattan Beach, California:

Entertainment
Erin Andrews: TV sports reporter and co-host of Dancing with the Stars
Vanessa Baden, actress (Kenan & Kel)
Brad Bird: director (The Incredibles, Ratatouille)
Rachel Bloom: comedian, actress, singer
Jenn Brown: ESPN reporter
Dave Coulier: actor, comedian (Full House, Fuller House)
Colin Cowherd: Host of Fox Sports Talk show The Herd
Zooey Deschanel: actress (New Girl)
Don Dokken: founder/lead singer of 1980s heavy metal band Dokken
Jane Elliot: actress (General Hospital, Days of Our Lives)
Matthew Fox: actor (Lost, Party of Five)
Scott Gurney: TV producer (Duck Dynasty)
John Ireland: play-by-play broadcaster for Los Angeles Lakers and radio personality
Neal Israel: director of Surf Ninjas and falconer
Andre Jacquemetton: Emmy-winning producer (Mad Men)
Kelly Kelly: actress, model and professional wrestler (born in Florida) (WAGS, Disturbing the Peace)
Wally Kurth: actor (General Hospital, Days of Our Lives)
Peyton Elizabeth Lee: actress (Andi Mack)
Jim Lindberg: singer of the South Bay punk rock band Pennywise
Ben McKenzie: actor (The O.C., Southland, Gotham)
Kristen Miller: actress (She Spies)
Marisa Miller: Sports Illustrated swimsuit issue cover model
Kevin Nealon: actor/comedian, Saturday Night Live
Harold Peary: radio, television and movie actor; named Manhattan Beach's honorary mayor in 1956
Liz Phair: singer/songwriter and guitarist
Teri Polo: actress (Meet the Parents, Meet the Fockers)
Redfoo: lead singer of LMFAO
Tara Reid: actress and model (Sharknado series)
J.D. Roth: reality TV host (Endurance)
Maria Sansone: television personality and host (Good Day LA)
Ben Sharples: actor (7500)
Cody Simpson: Australian singer/musician
Bob Thaves: cartoonist
Max Thieriot: actor (SEAL Team)
Vince Vaughn: actor
Scott Whyte: actor (City Guys)
Owen Wilson: actor
Amanda Wyss: actress (A Nightmare on Elm Street, Fast Times at Ridgemont High, The Id, The Sandman)
Rory O'Brien: Disc Jockey (Music 2 Go)

Journalists and writers

John Bollinger: creator of Bollinger Bands
Richard Foss: journalist and science fiction writer
Trace Gallagher: anchor and correspondent, Fox News Channel
Thomas Pynchon: novelist, The Crying of Lot 49, Gravity's Rainbow
Ryen Russillo: Ringer podcast and television writer
Michele Tafoya: sportscaster

Athletes

Basketball
Matt Barnes: Los Angeles Clippers player
Jeanie Buss: Executive Vice President and co-owner, L.A. Lakers
Brian Cook: forward for the Los Angeles Clippers
Mike D'Antoni: Head coach of the Houston Rockets
Robbie Davis: Lakers team trainer
Andy Enfield: head basketball coach for USC
Devean George: former NBA player
Blake Griffin: forward for the Los Angeles Clippers
Shaun Livingston: point guard for the Golden State Warriors
Slava Medvedenko: basketball player, former power forward for the Los Angeles Lakers
Chris Mihm: former center for the Los Angeles Lakers
Steve Nash: former NBA superstar player
Michael Olowokandi: former NBA player
Kurt Rambis: NBA player and coach
Željko Rebrača: former center for the Los Angeles Clippers
Brian Shaw: former NBA player and coach of the Denver Nuggets
Diana Taurasi: basketball player, five-time Olympic gold medalist, three-time NCCA champion, and three-time WNBA champion
Sasha Vujačić: shooting guard for the Brooklyn Nets
Luke Walton: former Head Coach of the L.A. Lakers

Football
Tim Brown: 1987 Heisman Trophy winner and NFL Hall of Famer
Pete Carroll: head coach of the Seattle Seahawks
Norm Chow: former University of Hawaii head football coach
Jeff Garcia: former NFL quarterback
Tony Gonzalez: former tight end for the Atlanta Falcons
Matt Leinart: Heisman Trophy winner, former USC and NFL quarterback, broadcaster
Jim Mora: former UCLA head football coach
Don Mosebar: played for the Los Angeles Raiders for 13 years
Rick Neuheisel: former Colorado, Washington, and UCLA head football coach; PAC-12 network broadcaster 
Ken O'Brien: former quarterback for the NY Jets
Josh Rosen: quarterback for Arizona Cardinals
Michael Strahan: television personality, former defensive end for the New York Giants

Baseball
Nomar Garciaparra: MLB shortstop, television broadcaster
Eric Karros: former MLB first baseman, television broadcaster
Jason Kendall: former MLB catcher
Paul LoDuca: former MLB catcher
Don Mattingly: manager of the Los Angeles Dodgers and former New York Yankees player

Soccer
Bruce Arena: head coach of the L.A. Galaxy
Bob Bradley: former head coach of the US Men's National Soccer Team
Landon Donovan: player for the Los Angeles Galaxy, U.S. National Team forward
Omar Gonzalez: player for the Los Angeles Galaxy
Mia Hamm: former soccer player, two-time Olympic gold medalist, World Cup Cup winner 
Cobi Jones: player for the Los Angeles Galaxy

Hockey
Rob Blake: former defenseman and current executive for the Los Angeles Kings
Dustin Brown: right winger for the L.A. Kings; given key to the city by Mayor Wayne Powell
Marc Crawford: former head coach for the Los Angeles Kings
Pavol Demitra: forward for the Minnesota Wild
Jason Doig: former NHL defenseman
Nelson Emerson: former NHL right winger; head of development for the Los Angeles Kings
Alexander Frolov: hockey player for the Los Angeles Kings
Marián Gáborík: former forward for the Los Angeles Kings
Tim Gleason: defenseman for the Carolina Hurricanes
Ron Hextall: former goaltender for the Philadelphia Flyers; former GM for the Flyers
Anže Kopitar: captain, center and Western Conference all-star for the Los Angeles Kings
Dean Lombardi: President and CEO of L.A. Kings
Glen Murray: former right winger for the Boston Bruins
Jonathan Quick: goaltender for the Los Angeles Kings
Mike Richards: center for the Los Angeles Kings
Luc Robitaille, President and CEO, L.A. Kings, former hockey star
Mathieu Schneider: former NHL hockey player
John Stevens: head coach of the Los Angeles Kings
Darryl Sutter: former head coach of the Los Angeles Kings
Ľubomír Višňovský: former defenseman for the Los Angeles Kings

Volleyball

Kerri Walsh Jennings: three-time Olympic beach volleyball player; given key to the city by Mayor Wayne Powell
 Alix Klineman (born 1989): volleyball player
Mike Lambert: former professional beach volleyball player
Stein Metzger: former professional beach volleyball player

Other sports
Victoria Azarenka: professional tennis player
Isabelle Connor: Olympic rhythmic gymnast
Maria Sharapova: professional tennis player, Olympic silver medalist; given key to the city by Mayor Wayne Powell
Pearl Sinn: former LPGA golfer
Rebecca Soni: five-time Olympic gold medalist swimmer and world record holder; given key to city by Mayor Wayne Powell
 Wally Wolf (1930–1997): swimmer, water polo player, and Olympic champion

Business people
Jordan Belfort: author of The Wolf of Wall Street 
John Bollinger: financial author, developer of the Bollinger Bands analysis method
The McMartin Family, operators of a pre-school in the city, were accused of sexual child abuse in the longest and most expensive criminal trial in American history.

References

Manhattan Beach
Manhattan Beach, California